Proterotheriidae is an extinct family of fossil ungulates from the Cenozoic era that displays toe reduction. Despite resembling primitive, small horses, they were only distantly related to them, and instead belonged to the native South American ungulate order Litopterna.

Description 
Two subfamilies and 18 genera of Proterotheriidae are known. All forms were small or medium-sized. Typical is a reduction of the number of toes and brachydont or mesodont teeth. The family is recorded since the late Palaeocene. Various fossils are known from many parts of the South American continent. The diversity decreased in the Miocene to Pliocene and it has been assumed for a long time that they entirely disappeared in the late Pliocene. However, fossils found in Argentina, Brazil and Uruguay show that one member of the group, Neolicaphrium recens survived into the Late Pleistocene.

Better known genera of the family include Diadiaphorus and Thoatherium from the Miocene.

Taxonomy 
 Proterotheriidae
 Anisolambda
 Anisolophus
 Brachytherium
 Diadiaphorus
 Diplasiotherium
 Eoauchenia
 Eolicaphrium
 Epecuenia
 Epitherium
 Guilielmofloweria
 Heteroglyphis
 Lambdaconus
 Lambdaconops
 Mesolicaphrium
 Neobrachytherium
 Neodolodus
 Neolicaphrium
 Olisanophus
 Paramacrauchenia
 Paranisolambda
 Picturotherium
 Prolicaphrium
 Promylophis
 Proterotherium
 Protheosodon
 Pseudobrachytherium
 Tetramerorhinus
 Thoatherium
 Thoatheriopsis
 Villarroelia
 Uruguayodon
 Wainka
 Xesmodon
 Megadolodinae
 Bounodus
 Megadolodus
 Indaleciidae
 Adiantoides
 Indalecia

Proterotheriidae is traditionally considered to include two subfamilies, Anisolambdinae and Proterotheriinae. Anisolambdinae (also called Anisolambdidae in some studies) was proposed to unite the primitive and earlier forms Anisolambda, Eolicaphrium, Paranisolambda, Protheosodon, Guilielmofloweria, Heteroglyphis, Lambdaconops, Wainka and Xesmodon. However, the phylogenetic analysis of McGrath and colleagues recovered the included genera to neither form their own clade, or to universally represent basal taxa outside the genera of Proterotheriinae per Soria, making Anisolambdinae a polyphyletic group of unrelated organisms.

Proterotheriidae was redefined by McGrath and colleagues in 2019 to be all taxa closer to Tetramerorhinus than Macrauchenia, Tricoelodus or Protolipterna. The cladogram below shows the modified results of their phylogenetic analysis, where incomplete taxa were placed based on morphology. The unrelated genera of the polyphyletic taxon Anisolambdinae or Anisolambdidae is highlighted in pink.

 }}

References 

 
Litopterns
Prehistoric mammal families
Paleocene first appearances
Holocene extinctions
Pleistocene mammals of South America
Neogene mammals of South America
Paleogene mammals of South America
Taxa named by Florentino Ameghino